Robert Dunlap (1766-1839) was an American artist, historian and playwright. He was born in Perth Amboy, New Jersey on 1 February 1766. In his lifetime he wrote more than 60 plays.

The majority of his plays were adaptations or translations from French or German works, although some were original; several were based on American themes and had American characters. He was the first of a long line of dramatists of the American theater.

Among his earliest works were:
The Father (1789)
Andre (1798)
The Stranger (1798)
False Shame (1799)
The Virgin of the Sun (1800)

He continued produce plays until 1828.

External links
Robert Dunlap

1766 births
1839 deaths